Bengt Lindblad (26 August 1925 – 6 March 1993) was a Swedish wrestler. He competed at the 1952 Summer Olympics and the 1956 Summer Olympics.

References

External links
 

1925 births
1993 deaths
Swedish male sport wrestlers
Olympic wrestlers of Sweden
Wrestlers at the 1952 Summer Olympics
Wrestlers at the 1956 Summer Olympics
People from Vänersborg Municipality
Sportspeople from Västra Götaland County
20th-century Swedish people